Robert David Nelson (born 2 July 1970) is an English cricketer.  Nelson is a left-handed batsman who bowls right-arm off break.  He was born in Chiswick, London and later educated at Harrow School.

Nelson represented the Middlesex Cricket Board in 3 List A matches.  These came against Wiltshire and Sussex in the 2000 NatWest Trophy and the Derbyshire Cricket Board in the 1st round of the 2003 Cheltenham & Gloucester Trophy which was held in 2002.  In his 3 career List A match he scored 7 runs at a batting average of 7.00, with a high score of 5*.  With the ball he bowled 23 wicket-less overs.

He currently plays club cricket Brondesbury Cricket Club in the Middlesex County Cricket League.

In 2020 Nelson made his debut for the Middlesex County Over-50s and was then selected for the England Over-50s team making his ODI debut vs Wales  on 23rd August 2020 taking 2-13.

References

External links
Robert Nelson at Cricinfo
Robert Nelson at CricketArchive

1970 births
Living people
People from Chiswick
Cricketers from Greater London
People educated at Harrow School
English cricketers
Middlesex Cricket Board cricketers